Jacqueline-Marie-Angélique Arnauld, S.O.Cist. or Arnault, called La Mère Angélique (8 September 1591, in Paris – 6 August 1661, in Port-Royal-des-Champs), was Abbess of the Abbey of Port-Royal, which under her abbacy became a center of Jansenism.

Biography
Arnauld was the third of the 20 children of the lawyer Antoine Arnauld, and one of six sisters of the philosopher Antoine Arnauld. From an early age, her family had determined that she should become not only a nun, but the superior of a convent.

While Arnauld was being raised by Cistercian nuns in the Abbey of Port-Royal-des-Champs, at the prompting of her maternal grandfather, Abbess Johanna von Boulehart selected her as her successor at the age of seven. The family forged her age on the documents forwarded to the Vatican. She was sent to be educated at Maubuisson Abbey, ruled by Angélique d'Estrées, sister of the Gabrielle d'Estrées, mistress of Henry IV. Months before her 12th birthday, she became coadjutrix to the Abbess of Port-Royal on 5 July 1602.  She was better known thereafter as La Mère Angélique.

Her days were taken up with walks, reading novels, and visits outside the monastery. In 1608, a sermon preached by a visiting Franciscan prompted her to effect a reform in her monastery. She was instrumental in the reforms of several other monasteries. Mère Angélique was guided and sustained at this time by Francis de Sales.

In 1625, thinking that the valley of Port-Royal was unhealthy for her religious, Mère Angélique established them all in Paris, in the Faubourg Saint-Jacques. In 1635, Arnauld came under the influence of Jean du Vergier de Hauranne, the Abbé of Saint-Cyran, one of the promoters of a school of theology which the Jesuits called Jansenism. She continually wrote letters encouraging some and condemning others, among the latter including even Vincent de Paul. During the 17th-century formulary controversy and the persecution of Port-Royal (1648–1652), she was forced to sign a document condemning the five propositions of Jansenism.

Arnauld's niece, Angélique de Saint-Jean, and her nephew, Antoine Le Maistre, persuaded her to write an autobiography, which was mostly the story of her community's heroic resistance in the face of its religious tribulations. It was of Mère Agnès and her religious that De Péréfixe, Archbishop of Paris, said: "These sisters are as pure as angels, but as proud as devils".

After her death in 1661, Angélique was succeeded as abbess by her sister, Agnès Arnauld.

See also
Catholic Church in France

Notes

References

.

External links
 Biographical study at Google Books
 Project Continua: Biography of Jacqueline-Marie-Angelique Arnauld

1591 births
1661 deaths
Nuns from Paris
Cistercian abbesses
Jansenists
16th-century French people
17th-century French people
16th-century Christian mystics
17th-century Christian mystics
French Roman Catholic abbesses
Cistercian mystics
Burials in Île-de-France